Alice Fischer (20 July 1932 – 31 August 2017) was a Swiss figure skater who competed in ladies singles.  She won the gold medal at the Swiss Figure Skating Championships in 1956 and 1957 and finished 18th at the 1956 Winter Olympics.

References

External links

Alice Fischer's obituary 

1932 births
2017 deaths
Swiss female single skaters
Olympic figure skaters of Switzerland
Figure skaters at the 1956 Winter Olympics